Golden Sun is a role-playing video game developed by Camelot Software Planning and published by Nintendo for the Game Boy Advance. It was released in August 2001 in Japan, November 2001 in North America and February 2002 in Europe. Golden Suns story follows a band of magic-attuned teenagers called Adepts on a mission to protect the world of Weyard from alchemy, a potentially destructive power long ago sealed away. During their quest, the Adepts develop new magic abilities (called Psynergy), assist others, and learn more about why alchemy was sealed away. Golden Sun is followed by a sequel, The Lost Age, which together form a complete story.

Golden Sun began as a single planned game for the Nintendo 64 console, but became a mobile title for the Game Boy Advance over the course of development. Facing hardware constraints, the developers decided to split the game into two. Golden Sun was critically and commercially successful, being the top-selling game for four months in Japan and selling more than one million units worldwide. The game was praised as one of the best RPGs on a handheld, rivalling those on full-size game consoles. IGN's Craig Harris said that Golden Sun could "arguably be one of the best 2D-based Japanese RPGs created for any system." The game spawned a series that includes three games and appearances in other media. Golden Sun was re-released for the Virtual Console via the Wii U eShop in April 2014, and will be released on the Nintendo Switch Online + Expansion Pack in 2023.

Gameplay

Golden Sun is a role-playing video game. The primary game mode is single-player and story-based, in which the player controls a cast of four characters as they embark on a quest, interact with other characters, battle monsters, and acquire new abilities and equipment. The game also contains a two-person player versus player battle mode, which requires each player to have a copy of the game and a Game Link Cable. Although many of the player's actions are compulsory, Golden Sun often allows the player to visit previous locations and complete certain objectives out of order.

The overworld of Golden Sun is filled with towns, caves, and dungeons. Players explore from a top-down perspective. Environments often have puzzles integrated into their layout. These puzzles require the player to perform actions such as creating makeshift bridges by pushing logs into rivers or shifting the track of a mine cart to gain access to new areas. Many of these puzzles require use of the game's form of magic spells, called "Psynergy"; this is in contrast to many RPGs, which often restrict magic to within battles and post-combat healing. Psynergy, however, is used for both purposes; for example, the "Whirlwind" spell that damages enemies in battle is also used out of battle to remove overgrown foliage blocking the player's path. Psynergy comes in four elements: Venus (manipulation of rocks and plants), Mars (revolving around fire and heat), Jupiter (based on wind and electricity), and Mercury (concerning water and ice). Players can return to previous locations in the game to finish puzzles which they could not solve earlier because of the lack of a specific Psynergy spell.

Golden Sun contains both random monster encounters, featuring randomly selected enemies, and compulsory boss battles that advance the story. During combat, the camera shifts to a pseudo-3D view, and spins and zooms during the battle depending on the attacks and items used. In each battle, players must defeat the enemies while keeping their own party alive through items and Psynergy that restore life and supplement defense. The player receives a "Game Over" if each character's hit points are reduced to zero; if this happens, the player will incur a monetary penalty and the party will be returned to the sanctum in the last visited town. After winning a battle, players receive experience points, coins, and occasionally items.

Players can change their characters' class and powers using Djinn. There are 28 Djinn in Golden Sun, seven each of the four elements. Once encountered in the overworld or in dungeons, they may either join the player willingly, or need to be defeated in combat. Assigning Djinn to different characters changes their character class, enabling them to use different psynergy, as well as statistics such as hit points or defense. Djinn can either be "Set" to a player or put on "Standby". Each Set Djinni has a special ability which can be invoked during combat by the character it is attached to, which can include enhanced elemental attacks, buffing/debuffing spells, healing/restoration spells, and other effects. After being used, the Djinni shifts to "Standby" mode until it is "Set" on the character again. In Standby mode, Djinn do not contribute to character statistics, but can be used for powerful elemental summon spells; after being used for summoning, they return to the Set position after a cooldown period.

Golden Sun also features an optional battling mode accessible from the menu screen. In this mode, players can enter a team from their saved game files into an arena environment where they battle increasingly difficult CPU-controlled enemies. Additionally, players can select three of their four characters to fight another player's three-character team. The player does not receive any reward or punishment for participating in these battles.

Synopsis

Setting and characters
Golden Sun takes place in the fantasy world of "Weyard"—a massive, earth-like environment with several major continents and oceans. Weyard is governed by the mythological concept of the classical elements. Matter consists of any combination of the four base elements: Venus (earth), Mars (fire), Mercury (water), and Jupiter (wind). These elements can be manipulated by the now lost powers of alchemy. Certain people, called Adepts, can use Psynergy (magic) based on the elements.

The player controls four teenaged Adepts in Golden Sun: Isaac, his close friend Garet, Ivan, and Mia. A fifth character playable in the game's exposition sequence is Jenna, another childhood friend to Isaac. The primary antagonists of the game are Saturos and Menardi, a pair of immensely powerful and talented Adepts whose goal is to restore Alchemy to the world. They are assisted by the powerful and mysterious Alex, who used to be Mia's apprentice; and Jenna's older brother, Felix, who is indebted to Saturos for saving his life.

Plot
The power of alchemy in Weyard's ancient past enabled the development of great civilizations. This age devolved into worldwide conflict that subsided only with the power of alchemy sealed away. The keys to unlocking alchemy are four elemental stars hidden within the mountain shrine, Mt. Aleph, which in turn is guarded by the town of Vale at the mountain's base. In the game's prologue, Saturos and Menardi lead a raiding party into Mt. Aleph to seize the elemental stars for themselves. They accidentally activate protective traps, causing a thunderstorm and rock slide. In the ensuing chaos, Felix, Isaac's father, and Jenna's parents are all presumed dead.

Three years later, Isaac, Garet, and Jenna join their teacher, Kraden, in his research of Mt. Aleph. They are confronted by Saturos and Menardi, now assisted by Alex and a surviving Felix, who coerce Isaac into giving them three of the four stars. Forced to flee as the volcano erupts, Saturos and Menardi abduct Jenna and Kraden as bargaining chips. Isaac and Garet are saved by the guardian of Mt. Aleph, the Wise One. He instructs the teens to prevent Saturos' group from casting the stars into their respective elemental lighthouses across Weyard, unsealing alchemy's power.

Isaac and Garet pursue Saturos' group to the Mercury Lighthouse, meeting Ivan and Mia during their travels. Despite their best efforts, they fail to prevent Saturos from activating Mercury Lighthouse. Saturos' group leaves for the next Lighthouse with Isaac's party in pursuit. In the ensuing chase, Isaac learns that Saturos has taken another Adept hostage: the female Jupiter Adept, Sheba. Saturos and Menardi activate the Venus Lighthouse before Isaac's party confronts them. Attempting to annihilate their opponents, Saturos and Menardi magically merge to form a massive two-headed dragon, but Isaac's party kills them. The remnants of Saturos's group continue their quest to light the remaining two lighthouses, with Jenna, Sheba, and Kraden still with them. The game ends as Isaac's party boards a ship to sail Weyard's open seas and continue their mission.

Development
Camelot Software Planning spent between twelve and eighteen months developing Golden Sun, considered a long time for a handheld video game; IGN described the finished product as a testament to the positive results a long development cycle can bring. Camelot was no stranger to role-playing games, having previously developed Shining Force for Sega, and Mario Golf and Mario Tennis for Nintendo—sports games with role-playing elements.

Camelot originally planned to create a single game instead of a series, and in the early stages of the project created a game design document for Golden Sun on the Nintendo 64 console. When it became apparent the Nintendo 64 was being replaced by the Nintendo GameCube, Camelot shifted their focus to making a game on the handheld Game Boy Advance. Due to the developer's ambitions for the scope of the game and the hardware limitations of a single Game Boy Advance cartridge, the single game was expanded to become two. Scenario writer Hiroyuki Takahashi and director Shugo Takahashi had previously designed Shining Force III, where the story involved playing through the perspectives of both the "good" and "bad" characters. They incorporated elements of this storytelling methodology into the two-game setup of the Golden Sun series, having the player control the  protagonists in Golden Sun and the antagonists in the followup.

A major goal with Golden Sun was to make the game's magic usable outside battle for puzzles, and offer players a high level of freedom in how to approach events, rather than a linear story that could only be experienced one way. Camelot's President Hiroyuki Takahashi asserted that players would be unable to experience all story paths in a single playthrough, and that this combined with the game's multiplayer mode would add to Golden Suns replay value.

In August 2000, Camelot showed an early but playable version at the Nintendo Space World Expo in Japan. The game was intended to launch alongside the Game Boy Advance, but slipped to the summer and released in Japan in August 2001. While it was eagerly anticipated in the west, players had to make do with Japanese-language imports until the game was localized and released in North America in November, and Europe in February 2002.

Reception

Golden Sun sold 740,000 copies in the United States and 338,000 in Japan. It received generally positive reviews from critics, with average scores of 91% and 90% on the review aggregator sites Metacritic and GameRankings, respectively, indicating critical acclaim.

Many reviewers praised the game's graphics, sound, and varied yet refined RPG gameplay, with particular emphasis on the Battle Mode and Djinn system. Certain critics felt that, despite the technical limitations of its 32-bit cartridge, the game's graphical quality was still extremely high; GameSpot wrote that "Golden Sun is a throwback to some of the SNES's best." Complaints generally focused on a perceived overuse of text dialogue in the game's cutscenes—particularly during the prologue section. Some faulted the game for relying on the typical random battle encounter mechanics present in many other role-playing games.

G4 TV stated, "It's the best original (nonport) GBA RPG to date", while GamePro called it a "huge, fantastic, creative, and wickedly fun RPG that doesn't seem to care that it's 'just' on a GBA". Game Informer called Golden Sun "a visual treat", and said that its graphics "would have amazed Super Nintendo owners back in the day". Noting the game's similarity to previous Japanese role-playing games, the reviewers believed that it was "easily the best original RPG on the GBA", and the "new ruler in the GBA RPG realm". Advance compared the game to the Pokémon series, and considered its graphics "luscious" and sound "incredible [and] cinematic". Despite describing its plot as "Cliche City", the magazine hailed the game as "the best handheld role-player ever".

In 2001, Golden Sun was a nominee in GameSpots annual "Best Game Boy Advance Game" and, among console games, "Best Role-Playing Game" award categories. Golden Sun was ranked 94 on IGN's Readers Choice Top 100 games ever. In 2007, it was named 24th best Game Boy Advance game in IGN's feature reflecting on the Game Boy Advance's long lifespan; the website also named it Game of the Month for April 2003 because it had "amazing graphics and sound presentation, as well as a quest that lasts for more than thirty hours." It was rated the 31st best game made on a Nintendo system in Nintendo Power's Top 200 Games list. In 2023, Time Extension included the game on their "Best JRPGs of All Time" list.

References

External links
The official Nintendo Golden Sun website 
The official Camelot Golden Sun website 

2001 video games
Game Boy Advance games
Game Boy Advance-only games
Nintendo Switch Online games
Video games developed in Japan
Video games scored by Motoi Sakuraba
Virtual Console games
Virtual Console games for Wii U
Golden Sun
Jinn in popular culture

de:Golden Sun#Golden Sun